SV Concordia may refer to:

 Concordia (ship), Sailing Vessel Concordia, a ship that sunk off the coast of Brazil
 SV Concordia Königsberg, SV Concordia in Königsberg, a defunct soccer club from Königsberg
 SV Concordia Nordhorn, SV Concordia in Nordhorn, a defunct soccer club that merged into Eintracht Nordhorn